Red Bridge is a neighborhood in South Kansas City, Missouri.  It is centered on the intersection of Red Bridge Road and Holmes Road, on the south side of I-435.  Avila University, Minor Park, and the Mount Moriah Cemetery are all located within the Red Bridge neighborhood.

History
A post office called Red Bridge was established in 1888, the name was changed to Redbridge in 1895, and the post office closed in 1902. The community was named for a red bridge near the original town site.

Education
Red Bridge has a public library, a branch of the Mid-Continent Public Library.

References

External links
 Map of the neighborhoods in Kansas City

Neighborhoods in Kansas City, Missouri